Peter Stafford (born 30 May 1978 in Christchurch, New Zealand) is a field hockey player from New Zealand. He won the silver medal at the 2002 Commonwealth Games in the men's team competition.

References

New Zealand male field hockey players
1978 births
Living people
2002 Men's Hockey World Cup players
Commonwealth Games silver medallists for New Zealand
Commonwealth Games medallists in field hockey
Field hockey players at the 2002 Commonwealth Games
Medallists at the 2002 Commonwealth Games